Brandon Wu (born February 17, 1997) is an American professional golfer who plays on the PGA Tour. He won the 2020 Korn Ferry Tour Championship.

Amateur career
Wu attended boarding school at Deerfield Academy in Massachusetts and was on the swim team through high school. He attended Stanford University 2015–2019 and played his college golf for the Stanford Cardinal men's golf team. In his senior year, they won the NCAA Division I Men's Golf Championship.

Wu played in the 2019 Walker Cup and the 2019 Arnold Palmer Cup. He teamed with Stewart Hagestad, Emilia Migliaccio, and Rose Zhang to win the mixed team gold medal at the 2019 Pan American Games.

Wu's individual achievements include winning the 2017 Porter Cup. He was a semifinalist at the 2018 Western Amateur and competed in U.S. Amateur in 2018 and again in 2019, where he was the stroke play medalist. He was the qualifying medalist for 2019 Open Championship and tied for 35th in 2019 U.S. Open with rounds of 71-69-71-74 (285, +1). Wu had to miss his graduation from Stanford because he was playing in the final round at Pebble Beach. He received his diploma as he walked off the 18th green.

Professional career
Wu turned professional in 2019 and joined the 2020 Korn Ferry Tour with conditional status from a tied 61st place at the 2019 Korn Ferry Tour Final Qualifying Tournament. He did not make a start until the 13th event of the season, the Price Cutter Charity Championship, where he finished tied 9th and earned enough points to climb the priority ranking and compete in four events which granted entry based on the points list. In those four tournaments, he was runner-up at Albertsons Boise Open and won the Korn Ferry Tour Championship. Due to the COVID-19 pandemic, there was no graduating class in 2020, and the 2020 Korn Ferry Tour season extended into 2021.

Wu earned his card for the 2021–22 PGA Tour as he finished the 2020–21 combined Korn Ferry Tour season 16th on the points list, recording a win, two runner-up finishes and seven top-10s across 28 starts. In 2022, he finished in a tie for 3rd at the Puerto Rico Open, tied for 2nd at the Mexico Open, and tied for 6th at the Genesis Scottish Open.

Amateur wins
2013 AJGA Junior at Centennial
2017 Porter Cup
2019 The Goodwin

Source:

Professional wins (1)

Korn Ferry Tour wins (1)

Results in major championships

CUT = missed the half-way cut
"T" = tied for place
NT = No tournament due to COVID-19 pandemic

Results in The Players Championship

"T" indicates a tie for a place

U.S. national team appearances
Amateur
Walker Cup: 2019 (winners)
Arnold Palmer Cup (representing the United States): 2019

See also
2021 Korn Ferry Tour Finals graduates

References

External links

American male golfers
Stanford Cardinal men's golfers
PGA Tour golfers
Pan American Games medalists in golf
Pan American Games gold medalists for the United States
Golfers at the 2019 Pan American Games
Medalists at the 2019 Pan American Games
Golfers from California
People from Danville, California
People from Scarsdale, New York
1997 births
Living people